Dave McDaniels (April 9, 1945 – June 14, 2012) was an American football wide receiver in the National Football League for the Dallas Cowboys. He played college football at Mississippi Valley State University.

Early years
McDaniels attended Miami Northwestern Senior High School. He accepted a scholarship from Mississippi Valley State University, where he played at wide receiver. As a freshman, he made 9 receptions for 200 yards. The next year he had 34 receptions for 496 yards and 3 touchdowns.

As a junior, he posted 65 receptions for 1,236 yards (led the NAIA) and 7 touchdowns. His 137.3 yards per game broke an NAIA record. In his last year he tallied 51 receptions for 800 yards and 2 touchdowns.

He was inducted into the Mississippi Valley State University Athletics Hall of Fame.

Professional career

Dallas Cowboys
McDaniels was selected in the second round  (45th overall) of the 1968 NFL Draft by the Dallas Cowboys, becoming the highest drafted player from Mississippi Valley State University, until Jerry Rice in 1985. In training camp he was tried both at wide receiver and tight end.

He had a disappointing rookie season, playing in only 4 games and spending most of the year on the team's taxi squad. He was traded to the Philadelphia Eagles for Mike Ditka on January 28, 1969.

Philadelphia Eagles
On July 31, 1969, he was traded during training camp to the Chicago Bears in exchange for a seven-round pick (#158-Terry Brennan).

Chicago Bears
McDaniels lasted just a week with the Chicago Bears before being traded to the Los Angeles Rams, in exchange for a seven-round draft choice (#176-Dennis Ferris) on August 11, 1969.

Los Angeles Rams
He was released after one month with the Los Angeles Rams on August 25, 1969.

New Orleans Saints
McDaniels was claimed by the New Orleans Saints, but he was released before the start of the 1969 season.

Montreal Alouettes
In 1970, he signed with the Montreal Alouettes of the Canadian Football League. On July 7, his rights were sold to the British Columbia Lions.

Personal life
After football, he taught physical education in the Richmond Public School District and the Prince George's County Public Schools. He died on June 14, 2012.

References

External links
McDaniels Erases NAIA Catch Mark

1945 births
2012 deaths
Miami Northwestern Senior High School alumni
Players of American football from Miami
American football wide receivers
Mississippi Valley State Delta Devils football players
Dallas Cowboys players
Players of Canadian football from Miami